State Route 191 (SR 191) is a  state highway that serves as a connection between Maplesville and Jemison in western Chilton County. SR 191 intersects SR 22 at its southern terminus and US 31 at its northern terminus.

Route description
SR 191 begins at its intersection with SR 22 just east of Maplesville. The route progresses in a northerly direction through its intersection with County Road 36 (CR 36) where it turns in a northeasterly direction en route to its northern terminus at US 31 in Jemison.

Major intersections

References

191
Transportation in Chilton County, Alabama